Xylota cupripurpura is a species of hoverfly in the family Syrphidae.

Distribution
Xylota cupripurpura is predominantly located within China.

References

Eristalinae
Insects described in 2004
Diptera of Asia